George Heron (1919–2011) was president of the Seneca Nation of Indians.

George Heron may also refer to:
George Heron (cricketer) (born 1962), Jamaican cricketer
George Heron (MP), Member of Parliament for Northumberland
George Hubert Heron (1852–1914), English footballer

See also
George Herron (disambiguation)